The 2005 FIS Freestyle World Ski Championships took place at the Rukatunturi ski resort in Kuusamo, Finland, between March 17th and March 20th. Five events were held for each sex, including half-pipe, skicross, aerials, moguls and dual moguls.

Results

Men's Results

Half-Pipe
The men's event took place on March 17.

Ski Cross
The men's event took place on March 18.

Aerials
The men's event took place on March 18.

Moguls
The men's event took place on March 19.

Dual Moguls
The men's event took place on March 20.

Women's Results

Half-Pipe
The women's event took place on March 17.

Ski Cross
The women's event took place on March 18.

Aerials
The women's event took place on March 18.

Moguls
The women's event took place on March 19.

Dual Moguls
The women's event took place on March 20.

References

External links
 FIS Home
 Results from the FIS

2005
2005 in Finnish sport
2005 in freestyle skiing
Kuusamo
Freestyle skiing competitions in Finland